State Highway 18 (SH 18) is a State Highway in Kerala that starts from 
Munnar and ends at the Kerala State Boundary. The highway is 32.1 km long.

The Route Map 
Munnar (starts from km 113/6 of Aluva - Munnar road) - Madypatty dam - Indo Swiss Project Gate - Top Station - State boundary - Road continues to Tamil Nadu as part of Kodaikanal–Munnar Road

See also 
Roads in Kerala
List of State Highways in Kerala

References 

State Highways in Kerala
Roads in Idukki district